"Boss' Life" is the fourth and final single from Snoop Dogg's 8th studio album Tha Blue Carpet Treatment. The song originally featured Akon, but due to label issues the original vocals were replaced by Nate Dogg's for the single version. The lyrics of Snoop Dogg were co-written by The D.O.C. It samples "If Tomorrow Never Comes" by The Controllers.
This is the last single that Nate Dogg was featured on before his death in 2011.

Personnel
Written By C. Broadus, A. Thiam, N. Hale, A. Young, T. Curry, D. Camon, D. Lamb, T. Smith S. Benton, D. Parker)
Produced by Dr. Dre.
Published by My Own Chit Publishing/EMI Blackwood Music (BMI); Byefall Music/Famous Music Publishing (ASCAP); WB Music Corp. (ASCAP); Almo Music Corp (ASCAP); Every Knight Music Co. (BMI), Warner-Tamerlane Pub Corp. (BMI), Unichappell Music Inc. (BMI) and Teamsta Entertainment Music (BMI) ; YEL-NATS (BMI); Psalm 144:1 Music (BMI)
Keyboards by Dawaun Parker
Guitar by John “Natural” Najera

Music video
The music video premiered on BET's Access Granted on March 21, 2007 which features Snoop Dogg in a mansion with girls dancing around and ending with a big puff of smoke is blown that reads "Tha Blue Carpet Treatment". The video premiered on MTV's TRL on April 17, 2007 3:30pm est & pst with Snoop Dogg and Don Magic Juan being the guests of the show.

Personnel
Anthony Mandler, director
Kim Bradshaw, producer
Box Fresh, production co
Ketil Dietrichson, cinematographer
Jeff Selis, editor

Charts

Weekly charts

Remixes
An official remix with additional verse by JT The Bigga Figga is available on DubCNN. It is also available on Snoop Dogg and JT the Bigga Figga's Myspace pages.

References

 1) Anfiny

2007 singles
Snoop Dogg songs
Nate Dogg songs
Akon songs
Music videos directed by Anthony Mandler
Songs written by Akon
Songs written by Snoop Dogg
Song recordings produced by Dr. Dre
Songs written by Nate Dogg
2006 songs
Geffen Records singles
Gangsta rap songs
G-funk songs